Plica medemi,   Medem's treerunner, is a species of South American lizard in the family Tropiduridae. The species is found in Colombia.

References

Plica
Lizards of South America
Reptiles of Colombia
Reptiles described in 2013